Regina König is a West German former luger who competed in the late 1970s. She was the first women's singles Luge World Cup overall champion in 1977-8.

References
List of women's singles luge World Cup champions since 1978.

Living people
German female lugers
Year of birth missing (living people)